Lord Charles Spencer PC (31 March 1740 – 16 June 1820) was a British courtier and politician from the Spencer family who sat in the House of Commons between 1761 and 1801.

Early life
Spencer was born on 31 March 1740. He was the second son of Charles Spencer, 3rd Duke of Marlborough, and the Hon. Elizabeth Trevor, daughter of Thomas Trevor, 2nd Baron Trevor. George Spencer, 4th Duke of Marlborough, was his elder brother.

Career
Spencer sat as Member of Parliament for Oxfordshire from 1761 to 1790 and 1796 to 1801 and was sworn of the Privy Council in 1763. 

He served as Comptroller of the Household from 1763 to 1765, as a Junior Lord of the Admiralty from 1768 to 1779 and as Treasurer of the Chamber from 1779 to 1782, when that sinecure post was abolished. He was later Postmaster General from 1801 to 1806 and Master of the Mint in 1806. From 1806 until his death, he was a Gentleman of the Bedchamber to George III.

Personal life

On 2 October 1762, Spencer was married to Lady Mary Beauclerk (1743–1812), a daughter of Vere Beauclerk, 1st Baron Vere and the sister of Aubrey Beauclerk, 5th Duke of St Albans. Together, they had three sons:

 Robert Spencer (1764–1831), who married Henrietta ( Fawkener) Bouverie, a daughter of Sir Everard Fawkener, and widow of Hon. Edward Bouverie, in 1811.
 John Spencer (1767–1831), MP for Wilton who married his cousin, Lady Elizabeth Spencer, a daughter of the 4th Duke of Marlborough.
 William Robert Spencer (1769–1834), who married Countess Susan von Jenison-Walworth.

Lady Charles Spencer died in January 1812 aged 68. Lady Mary survived her by eight years and died in June 1820, aged 80.

References

|-

1740 births
1820 deaths
Younger sons of dukes
Lords of the Admiralty
United Kingdom Postmasters General
Masters of the Mint
Members of the Parliament of Great Britain for English constituencies
Members of the Privy Council of Great Britain
British MPs 1761–1768
British MPs 1768–1774
British MPs 1774–1780
British MPs 1780–1784
British MPs 1784–1790
British MPs 1790–1796
British MPs 1796–1800
Charles Spencer